Bolotbek Shamshiyev (12 January 1941 – 21 December 2019) was a Kyrgyz film director and screenwriter. He directed eleven films between 1965 and 1988. His 1976 film The White Ship was entered into the 26th Berlin International Film Festival.

Selected filmography
 The White Ship (1976)

References

External links

1941 births
2019 deaths
Soviet film directors
Kyrgyzstani film directors
Soviet screenwriters
Male screenwriters